Soumaïla Coulibaly (born 14 October 2003) is a French professional footballer who plays as a centre-back for Bundesliga club Borussia Dortmund.

Club career 
Coulibaly is a product of the Paris Saint-Germain Academy. However, he never signed a professional contract with Paris Saint-Germain because he rejected the chance to do so, instead preferring to sign for Borussia Dortmund in Germany. In an interview with Le Parisien in March 2021, Coulibaly explained his decision to leave Paris, stating that "there is not much space for [young players at PSG]" and that the "quality of the PSG squad, which signs lots of great players, makes it very difficult for youngsters to succeed". He joined Dortmund upon the expiration of his contract on 1 July 2021.

International career 
Coulibaly has been capped by France at under-16 and under-17 level.

Personal life 
Born in France, Coulibaly is of Malian descent.

References

External links 
 Profile at the Borussia Dortmund website
 

2003 births
Living people
French footballers
France youth international footballers
Association football central defenders
People from Montfermeil
French sportspeople of Malian descent
Black French sportspeople
Paris Saint-Germain F.C. players
Borussia Dortmund II players
Borussia Dortmund players
3. Liga players
French expatriate footballers
Expatriate footballers in Germany
French expatriate sportspeople in Germany